Table tennis  was contested at the 2019 Summer Universiade from 4 to 11 July 2019 at the PalaTrincone in Naples.

Medal summary

Medal table

Events

References

External links
2019 Summer Universiade – Table tennis
Results book – Table tennis

 
Universiade
2019 Summer Universiade events
2019